George H. Mallon (June 15, 1877 – August 2, 1934) was an officer in the United States Army who received the Medal of Honor for his actions during World War I.

Biography
Mallon was born in Ogden, Kansas on June 15, 1877. He was commissioned as a captain in August 1917, and honorably discharged in June 1919. Mallon died August 2, 1934, and is buried at Fort Snelling National Cemetery in Minneapolis, Minnesota.

Awards
Medal of Honor
Purple Heart
Philippine Campaign Medal
World War I
Army of Occupation of Germany Medal
Legion of Honor (France)
Croix de Guerre with palm (France)

Medal of Honor citation

Rank and organization: Captain, U.S. Army, 132d Infantry, 33d Division. Place and date: In the Bois-de-Forges, France, 26 September 1918. Entered service at: Minneapolis, Minn. Born: 15 June 1877 Ogden, Kans. G.O. No.: 16, W.D., 1919.

Citation:

Becoming separated from the balance of his company because of a fog, Capt. Mallon, with 9 soldiers, pushed forward and attacked 9 active hostile machineguns, capturing all of them without the loss of a man. Continuing on through the woods, he led his men in attacking a battery of four 155-millimeter howitzers, which were in action, rushing the position and capturing the battery and its crew. In this encounter Capt. Mallon personally attacked 1 of the enemy with his fists. Later, when the party came upon 2 more machineguns, this officer sent men to the flanks while he rushed forward directly in the face of the fire and silenced the guns, being the first one of the party to reach the nest. The exceptional gallantry and determination displayed by Capt. Mallon resulted in the capture of 100 prisoners, 11 machineguns, four 155-millimeter howitzers and 1 antiaircraft gun.

See also

List of Medal of Honor recipients
List of Medal of Honor recipients for World War I

References

United States Army Medal of Honor recipients
United States Army officers
People from Riley County, Kansas
1877 births
1934 deaths
United States Army personnel of World War I
World War I recipients of the Medal of Honor
Military personnel from Kansas